Minis may refer to:

 Miniș (disambiguation), the name of several places and rivers in Romania
 Minis (surname), a Jewish surname (with a list of people of this name)

See also
 Mini (disambiguation)